Drumone is a small village and townland in western County Meath, Ireland.

The local Roman Catholic church is dedicated to St. Mary and was built in 1834. A nearby disused Gaelic handball court dates to c.1920. The local GAA club is Moylagh GAA.

References

Towns and villages in County Meath